Vladimír Nadrchal (born March 4, 1938 in Pardubice, Czechoslovakia) is an ice hockey player who played for the Czechoslovak national team. He won a bronze medal at the 1964 Winter Olympics, and a silver medal at the 1968 Winter Olympics.

References

External links

1938 births
Czech ice hockey goaltenders
Czechoslovak ice hockey goaltenders
Ice hockey players at the 1960 Winter Olympics
Ice hockey players at the 1964 Winter Olympics
Ice hockey players at the 1968 Winter Olympics
Living people
Medalists at the 1964 Winter Olympics
Medalists at the 1968 Winter Olympics
Olympic bronze medalists for Czechoslovakia
Olympic ice hockey players of Czechoslovakia
Olympic medalists in ice hockey
Olympic silver medalists for Czechoslovakia
Sportspeople from Pardubice
HC Dynamo Pardubice players
HC Kometa Brno players
LHK Jestřábi Prostějov players
Czech ice hockey coaches
Czechoslovak ice hockey coaches